Lawrence Avenue is a major east-west thoroughfare in Toronto, Ontario, Canada. It is divided into east and west portions (Lawrence Avenue East and Lawrence Avenue West) by Yonge Street, the dividing line of east-west streets in Toronto.

Route description 
The western terminus of Lawrence Avenue is Royal York Road. Beyond the terminus, the road continues as The Westway, a windy arterial road that ends at Martin Grove Road constructed post-World War II to serve the growing Richview neighbourhood development to the south and the Kingsview Village neighbourhood to the north. Eastwards from a short stretch in Etobicoke; where it runs through the Humber Heights – Westmount neighbourhood, Lawrence crosses the Humber River and enters Weston in the former city of York. East of Weston it enters North York, and passes through the neighbourhoods of Amesbury, Maple Leaf, Glen Park, Lawrence Heights, and Lawrence Manor. Through this section, the street is mostly home to low-rise residential, with some retail and office locations.

East of Avenue Road the road enters the Old City of Toronto, and is a major arterial for the North Toronto neighbourhood. This is one of the wealthiest parts of Toronto. Lawrence remains almost wholly residential through this section, with many single-family homes. Lawrence Avenue East is interrupted at Bayview Avenue, by the west branch of the Don River. A detour north on Bayview leads to Post Road and a connection back to Lawrence Avenue on the east side of the valley. This detour runs through The Bridle Path, one of Toronto's most affluent neighbourhoods. East of Leslie Street, Lawrence becomes a principal arterial road, passing through Don Mills. East of the Don River is the Lawrence Avenue exit of the Don Valley Parkway and on the southside is Old Lawrence Avenue where the road used to lead to a lost bridge that once crossed the Don River.

Lawrence continues as a six-lane road through most of Scarborough, with many strip malls flanking its sides. Through Scarborough it is the main east-west arterial for a number of neighbourhoods, including Wexford, Bendale, Woburn, and West Hill. The segment east of Morningside Avenue is primarily residential. The road ends at Rouge Hill Drive (then becomes a driveway into a Rouge Beach Park) near the Rouge River, east of Port Union where it hits Lake Ontario.

Public Transit
The Toronto Transit Commission's 52 Lawrence West and 54 Lawrence East (both are the longest bus routes in the city), and 124 Sunnybrook/162 Lawrence-Donway bus routes provide service along the length of the avenue. The 54A Lawrence East surface route operates from Eglinton Station to Starspray Boulevard near Rouge Park and the 52B Lawrence West surface route operates from Lawrence Station to Westwood Mall Bus Terminal in Mississauga west of Toronto Pearson International Airport via Dixon Road. There are three rapid transit stations; Lawrence at Yonge Street and Lawrence West at Allen Road on Line 1 Yonge–University, and Lawrence East on Line 3 Scarborough, between Kennedy Road and Midland Avenue. Until 1974, service between Lawrence station and Bayview Avenue was provided by the 52 Lawrence and was replaced by the 11 Bayview and 28B Davisville bus routes before being reorganized in 1991, with the 124 Sunnybrooke replacing it. The 58 Malton bus provided service between Lawrence West station to Westwood Mall in Mississauga until 2014. There are also 2 express buses that run during rush hours only, the 952 Lawrence West Express, which also runs from Lawrence Station to Pearson Airport, and the 954 Lawrence East Express, which runs from Lawrence East Station to Starspray Boulevard.

GO Transit has two commuter rail stations on Lawrence Avenue; Rouge Hill, on the Lakeshore East line, and Weston on the Kitchener line.

History

Lawrence Avenue was named after Jacob Lawrence, a tanner and farmer in the area of Yonge Street and Lawrence Avenue. It was a side road between lots 5 and 6 in York Township. Originally Lawrence Avenue only ran east of Yonge Street, with the road heading west to Weston being named McDougall Avenue

East of Victoria Park Avenue the road was also referred to as 1st Concession Road based on the original survey of the old Township of Scarborough (the line between Concession D and Concession 1). In sections west of Yonge Street the route for the current road would have been the Fourth Concession with Eglinton Avenue as Line between Third and Fourth Concession and St. Clair Avenue as the Third Concession.

During Hurricane Hazel in 1954, the Lawrence Avenue bridge over the Humber River was washed out when the river's water levels rose heavily as a result of the rainfall.
When the Don Valley Parkway was constructed in the 1960s, Lawrence was rebuilt between the Woodbine Avenue allowance, and Victoria Park Avenue, as a "jog eliminator" between the former concession roads of North York and Scarborough Townships. This portion to Kingston Road (former Highway 2), is a minimum of six lanes wide. Lawrence Avenue served as the "Base Line" for the Scarborough Township Survey in the 1800s, and remains a key road in that area.

Lawrence Avenue east of Meadowvale Road in Scarborough was part of Colonel Danforth Trail until the early 1970s.

Landmarks

References

 Lawrence family

Roads in Toronto